Marching Out of Time is a 1993 comedy film directed by Anton Vassil.

Plot
When a wacky squadron of World War II soldiers are mistakenly teleported to present day California, Fred must convince the police and his family that he is not losing his mind and that the future of the world is in danger.

Summary
Fred Johnson is an average American with a simple life, until he hears peculiar noises next door. His neighbor, Professor Memo, has conducted experiments which have crossed paths with a German time machine from 1942.

Fred and the professor must find a way to stop the Germans from taking vital information back through time, and change the course of history. Fred calls on police officer Butch, a by-the-book cop, who finds this story absurd... until he too finds himself face to face with the outlandish soldiers.

On a roller coaster rescue mission, Butch and Johnson overtake the squadron but it's too late. The records have already been taken back in time, leaving our heroes only one choice.... they must ride the vortex back to World War II.

Directed by Anton Vassil, this outrageous comical adventure takes us from Venice Beach to the bunker of 1942, and with history at stake, our modern day heroes are not just travelling through time, they're also saving the world.

Main cast
 Frederick Andersen - Fred Johnson
 Heinrich James - Lt. Von Konst
 Matthew Henerson - Prof. Memo
 Jeff Rector - Lt. Butch
 Robert Z'Dar - Muck
 Jim Boeven - Maj. Fürst

Main credits

 Music composed and conducted by David Rubinstein
 Director of Photography: Greg Daniels
 1st Assistant Director: Francis Lawrence
 Additional Music by Marc Crandall
 Casting by Eric de Santo
 Stunt Supervisors: Pete Porteous and Kent Ducanon
 Miniature Effects by Ted Crittenden

1993 films
American comedy films
1993 comedy films
1990s English-language films
1990s American films
Films about time travel